Biswanath Rath is an Indian film director, screenwriter, editor and producer. His films have received awards and recognitions in a total of 366 International Film Festivals. He is the founder of production company BnR Films LLP.

Work
His first short film, Kar Bhalaa, garnered a total of 42 International Film Festivals nominations and three awards. His debut music video was “Feel the Passion“. It has received 21 international film festival nominations. His first ad film, The 'Right' Glass is a social ad-film based on child rights, which has garnered two awards and 59 international film festival nominations. His Tamil music video, "Namma Chennai Chancey Illa," produced by national daily The Times of India with the theme celebration of Chennai and its culture, was premiered at TourFilm Riga - Tourism Film Festival in 2017. This video is a spiritual successor to Chancey Illa (2014). His English documentary, A Zero to Hero Collaborative Approach, released on World Food Day (2016) received the Audience Award at the AgriCulture Film Festival held in Rome (Italy) on 9 December 2017. This documentary tells the inspirational success story of the collaboration between Dangarbheja Gram Panchayat (Nabarangpur) and a civil society organization named Govindalaya.

His silent short film, New Champion, received the Best Film in Indian Panorama Award at CMS International Children's Film Festival at Lucknow on 9 April 2018.

His latest English documentary, Kotpad Weaving: The Story of a Race Against Time, was telecasted on DD National on 24 March 2018. It explores the uniqueness of Kotpad Handloom, the issues and possible solutions for revival of Kotpad weaving and dyeing. The film had its Australian premiere at Sydney on November 15, 2018 as part of a handloom exhibition titled “The Kotpad Collection” organized by brand Kay Collections (founded by Kushma Ram). It had its Indian premiere at Kashmir World Film Festival, Srinagar on 30 November 2018 where it won the Best Short Documentary award. The film also features 2019 Padma Shri award recipient Gobardhan Panika. The documentary film has garnered a total of 27 international film festival nominations and two awards. This film is the world's first documentary film on Kotpad Handloom. In June 2020, the film premiered on Amazon Prime US, UK, Canada, Australia and other English-speaking territories of Amazon Prime, making it the first documentary from Odisha to feature on a major global OTT platform.

In June 2020, his romantic Odia music video "ବର୍ଷା ଭିଜା ରାତି" ("Barshaa Bhijaa Raati") premiered on an OTT named IndieShorts, making it the first Odia music video to feature on a national OTT platform.

In August 2020, his friendship-themed Hindi music video, “Woh Bhi Kya Din the Yaar,” premiered on YouTube on Friendship day. This music video is India's first independently made crowd-sourced music video.

Personal life
Biswanath Rath was born in Jeypore, Odisha to Raghunath Rath and Pramila Rath. He is an alumnus of the Department of Mechanical Engineering at National Institute of Technology, Warangal. From 2007 to 2010, he worked in Maruti Suzuki India Limited after which he moved to Chennai to learn filmmaking. At Chennai, he completed formal courses in Screenwriting and Film Direction and started his filmmaking career.

In 2015, he founded film production company BnR Films LLP with his wife Archana Rath.

Awards and recognition from Indian socio-cultural associations

Filmography

References

Film directors from Odisha
Film editors from Odisha
Film producers from Odisha
1984 births
Living people